Beaverdale is an unincorporated community and census-designated place (CDP) in Flint River Township, Des Moines County, Iowa, United States. As of the 2010 census it had a population of 952. It is part of the Burlington, Iowa micropolitan area.

Geography

The CDP extends north to the valley of Flint Creek, which flows east to the Mississippi River just north of Burlington.

Demographics

As of the census of 2010, there were 952 people, 385 households, and 294 families residing in the town. The racial makeup of the town was 95.6% White, 1.5% African American, 0.3% Native American, 0.2% Asian, 0.1% from other races, and 2.3% from two or more races. Hispanic or Latino of any race were 1.8% of the population.

There were 385 households, out of which 25.5% had children under the age of 18 living with them, 61.6% were married couples living together, 10.1% had a female householder with no husband present, 4.7% had a male householder with no wife present, and 23.6% were non-families. 18.7% of all households were made up of individuals, and 6.8% had someone living alone who was 65 years of age or older. The average household size was 2.47 and the average family size was 2.77.

In the city the population was spread out, with 23.5% under the age of 18, 5.9% from 18 to 24, 22.5% from 25 to 44, 31.5% from 45 to 64, and 16.5% who were 65 years of age or older. The median age was 43.3 years. The gender makeup of the city was 49.2% male and 50.8% female.

References

Unincorporated communities in Des Moines County, Iowa
Unincorporated communities in Iowa
Burlington, Iowa micropolitan area